The coat of arms of Manitoba is the heraldic symbol representing the Canadian province of Manitoba. The arms contains symbols reflecting Manitoba's British heritage along with local symbols. At the upper part of the shield is the red cross of St. George, representing England. On the left, the unicorn represents Scotland. The lower portion of the shield features a bison standing atop a rock on a green background.

The original arms, consisting of only the shield, were granted by royal warrant of King Edward VII on 10 May 1905. The arms were further augmented with supporters, a crest, and motto, by a warrant of then-Governor General Ramon Hnatyshyn on  23 October 1992. 

The shield also features on the provincial flag.

History

The coat of arms was augmented on 23 October 1992 by a vice-regal warrant of then-Governor General Ramon Hnatyshyn to include a crest, supporters, and motto.

Symbolism
Crest
The helmet above the shield is gold and faces left, a symbol of Manitoba's co-sovereign status in Confederation. The mantling is in the national colours of Canada. The crest is a beaver, Canada's national animal, holding a prairie crocus, Manitoba's provincial flower. The crest is surmounted by a crown, representing royal sovereignty. 
 
Shield
On the white chief is the Cross of Saint George, a symbol of England. The bison is a symbolic reminder of the various bison that formerly roamed the province. The remainder of the Coat of Arms was granted in 1992.
 
Compartment
The compartment represents a diverse landscape.

Supporters
The beadwork and Red River wheel allude to Manitoba's past, while the maple leaf is the national emblem of Canada.

Motto
The motto is Gloriosus et Liber, "glorious and free," a line taken from the English lyrics to the Canadian national anthem "O Canada."

Animals 
Beaver, Bison, Horse, Unicorn

See also
Symbols of Manitoba
Flag of Manitoba
Canadian heraldry
National symbols of Canada
List of Canadian provincial and territorial symbols
Heraldry

References

External links

Arms of Manitoba in the online Public Register of Arms, Flags and Badges

Provincial symbols of Manitoba
Manitoba
Manitoba
Manitoba
Manitoba
Manitoba
Manitoba
Manitoba
Manitoba
Manitoba
Manitoba